Polychrus auduboni, or smooth-backed bush anole, common monkey lizard, or many-colored bush anole, is a species of anole native to Venezuela and Trinidad and Tobago. It can be found in forests and shrublands.

References

Polychrotidae
Fauna of Venezuela
Fauna of Trinidad and Tobago
Species described in 1845
Taxa named by Edward Hallowell (herpetologist)